Nagsimula sa Puso (International title: It Started From the Heart / ) is a 2009 Philippine television drama romance series that aired on ABS-CBN's Hapontastic afternoon block. The show aired from October 12, 2009, to January 22, 2010, replacing Kambal sa Uma and was replaced by Magkano ang Iyong Dangal?. It is a remake of the 1990 film of the same name starring Hilda Koronel. Directed by Malu L. Sevilla, Ruel S. Bayani and Darnel Joy R. Villaflor, it stars Maja Salvador, Coco Martin, Nikki Gil, and Jason Abalos.

Overview

Original film
The original film was released in March 27, 1990, by Vision Films (predecessor of Star Cinema). It starred Hilda Koronel, Richard Gomez, Jay Ilagan, and Cherie Gil. It was directed by Mel Chionglo and written by Ricky Lee.

The film is digitally restored and remastered by the ABS-CBN Film Archives and Central Digital Lab and it was released in 2015.

Production
After the success of Sineserye Presents, ABS-CBN decided to make a new afternoon drama for daytime. Nagsimula Sa Puso was a 1990 film which earned Richard Gomez his first FAMAS awards and nominations. Richard Gomez played the role of a young college student in a heated affair with his college professor played by Hilda Koronel, who attempts revenge after being stricken with grief and resentment by his professor's mother, and takes revenge on his professor's now settled family only to obtain her for himself.

Throughout its press conference, Maja Salvador takes the lead as Hilda Koronel's character Celina Hernandez, a role in which Maja took time to analyze carefully when offered the project, she decided to give the green light and allowed herself to play the role because she wanted to experience a role out of character and taken seriously because of many projects in which she played teeny-bopper roles. After she mostly played adult roles only on anthology episodes of MMK variously, she decided to take the lead and do a love scene with film and TV actor Coco Martin who was recently in the TV series in the same year Tayong Dalawa before Nagsimula Sa Pusos debut on October 12, 2009, which also caused Maja to work anxiously. The series also revolved on serious actors such as Gloria Diaz (actress and beauty queen), Jaclyn Jose (film actress and drama TV series versatile actress) and Buboy Garovillo (veteran TV host, actor and member of the APO Hiking Society) and newcomer Nikki Gil and Joseph Bitangcol and actress and film director Laurice Guilllen in a special role.

Story and development
Celina Fernandez, a young college professor whose life has always been controlled by her mom, Minda (Jacklyn Jose). The latter puts such high hopes on her to the point that she is forced to live her dreams—that is to find a husband who’ll keep her future secure. But she couldn’t take more of Minda’s unyielding influence. So as an act of defiance, Celina not only rejects her rich boyfriend, Jim(Jason Abalos) offer to take her with him abroad but also his marriage proposal. To make matters worse, her professional life also turns upside down starting the day she meets engineering scholar Carlo Pagdanganan (Coco Martin). She instantly dislikes him for coming in late during their first day of classes and for making her look incompetent in front of the dean who’s very lenient with him. But what happens when she gets to know him more as a person? Would she ever consider falling in love with her own student?

Cast and characters

Main cast
Maja Salvador as Celina Fernandez
Coco Martin as Carlo Pagdanganan
Nikki Gil as Julie Bernardo
Jason Abalos as Jim Ortega

Supporting cast
Jaclyn Jose as Minda Fernandez
Buboy Garovillo as Tony Ortega
Gloria Diaz as Pinky Ortega
Irma Adlawan as Liza Bernardo
Ronnie Lazaro as Mario Bernardo
Joseph Bitangcol as Eugene Ventado
Maliksi Morales as Jimbo Ortega
Niña Jose as Charie
Bea Nicolas as Ana
Kakai Bautista as Missy

Guest cast
Laurice Guillen as Teresa Pagdanganan
Boom Labrusca as Oliver
Frenchie Dy as Franchesca
Jordan Castillo as Roger
Kris Martinez as Jon-Jon
Max Reyes as Dino
Acey Aquino as Sharlyn

Trivia 
After recognizing Coco Martin's Talent ABS-CBN Management and Director of Hit Primetime Dramas Iisa Pa Lamang (2008) and Tayong Dalawa (2009), Ruel Santos Bayani gave him a big break to direct Nagsimula Sa Puso.
The theme song is "Kung Alam Mo Lang" by Jed Madela, later re-interpreted by Maricris Garcia as the theme song of the titled Kakambal ni Eliana on GMA Network in 2013.

Awards and recognitions

It was recognized and nominated Favorite Afternoon Drama with other top rating ABS-CBN Afternoon Soaps such as Gilda Olvidado's Magkano ang Iyong Dangal? and Jim Fernandez's Kambal sa Uma in the 23rd PMPC for Favorite Afternoon Drama.

See also
List of programs broadcast by ABS-CBN
List of ABS-CBN drama series

Notes

References

External links
 Nagsimula sa Puso Nagsimula sa Puso Drama

ABS-CBN drama series
2009 Philippine television series debuts
2010 Philippine television series endings
Television series by Dreamscape Entertainment Television
Philippine romance television series
Live action television shows based on films
Filipino-language television shows
Television shows set in the Philippines